Kate Lister is an Australian actress and producer, best known for her lead role in the horror movie Unhinged (2017), directed by Dan Allen. Lister's portrayal of the character Rachel earned her critical acclaim and established her acting career. She also played series regular Lillian Liano, the quirky small-town cop, in Nine's SeaChange and Jeannine Murphy, the cutthroat journalist, in Netflix's Clickbait.

Early life and career 
Lister was born in Melbourne. She began her career in the entertainment industry as a vocalist and DJ at the age of 24, before transitioning to acting in 2012 with the movie Just the Way It Is. She has since worked on around a dozen short films, TV movies, and theatrical movies, including Sony Pictures' film Fox Trap. She has also starred in various TV shows like Neighbours, Bad Mothers and starred in Universal Studio's The Reef: Stalked and Slant, Monster Festival's Best Film for 2022.

In addition to her acting career, Lister continues to pursue her passion for music and performing as a DJ and vocalist. She is also a producer and co-owner of production company Little Fish Films. Lister trained at the renowned Atlantic Acting School in New York under the guidance of William H. Macy, Cynthia Silver, and David Mamet.

Filmography

Television

Films

Production

Awards and nominations

Festigious International Film Festival

Indie film chart

Queen Palm International Film Festival

References

External links
 

1985 births
Living people
Australian television actresses
Actresses from Melbourne